Shamsun Nahar Shimla (known as Shimla; born 4 December 1982) is a Bangladeshi film actress. She won Bangladesh National Film Award for Best Actress for her debut film Madam Fuli (1999).

Career
Shimla originated from a small town of Jhenaidah. She debuted in acting through her performance in the film Madam Fuli (1999).

Shimla was married to Palash Ahmed for eight months in 2018. Ahmed was involved in an attempt of aircraft hijacking incident in 2019 in which he was killed in a commando operation. Shimla met him in a birthday party of the director of the film Naiar (2017).

Works
Films
 Madam Fuli (1999) - Fuli / Shimla
 Pagla Ghonta (1999)
 Bheja Biral (2001)
 Dhawa (2001)
 Thekao Mastan (2001) - Sonali
 Uttejito (2002)
 Kafon Chara Dafon (2002)
 Bhalobashar Mullo Koto (2002)
 Boma Hamla (2002)
 Oshanto Agun (2002)
 Hason Raja (2002)
 Amar Target (2004)
 Lootpaat (2004)
 Mejaj Gorom
 Lal Sobuj (2005) - Nila
 Chotto Ektu Bhalobasha (2005)
 Sagorer Gorjon (2005)
 Na Bolona (2006)
 Porom Priyo (2006)
 Jhontu Montu Dui Bhai (2007)
 Choto Bon (2008)
 Akkel Alir Nirbachon (2008) - Moyna
 Na Manush
 Gangajatra (2009) - Rupa
 Zamidaar (2010)
 Jekhane Tumi Sekhane Ami (2010)
 Mayer Gaye Biyer Sharee (2011)
 Bhool (2011)
 Rupgawal (2013)
 Nekabborer Mohaproyan (2014) - Fatema
 Nishiddho Premer Golpo (formally Prem Kahan'')
 Naiyor

References

External links
 

Living people
1982 births
People from Jhenaidah District
Bangladeshi film actresses
20th-century Bangladeshi actresses
21st-century Bangladeshi actresses
Best Actress National Film Awards (Bangladesh) winners
Place of birth missing (living people)
Best Supporting Actress Bachsas Award winners